Isotherm may refer to:
 Isotherm (contour line) a type  of equal temperature at a given date or time on a geographic map
 Isotherm in thermodynamics, a curve on a P-V diagram for an isothermal process
 Moisture sorption isotherm a curve giving the functional relationship between humidity and equilibrium water content of a material for a constant temperature 
 Sorption isotherm a curve giving the functional relationship between adsorbate and adsorbent in a constant-temperature adsorption process

cs:Izotermický děj#Izoterma